Paralia (Paralía) is a Greek term meaning "beach" or "coastline".

Towns
 Paralia, Achaea
 Paralia, Pieria
 Paralia Distomou
 Paralia Lygias
 Paralia Skotinas
 Paralia Avdira
 Paralia Panteleimonos
 Paralios Kaisareia, the Greek name for Caesarea Maritima

Beaches
 Paralia Chiladou
 Paralia Koulouras
 Paralia Sergoula
 Paralia Platanos

Historical places
 Paralia (Attica), region of Attica
 Paralia (Seleucid eparchy)
 Phoenice Paralia

Animals
 Agdistis paralia